"Thanksgiving" is the sixth episode of the tenth season of the animated comedy series Family Guy. It originally aired on Fox in the United States on November 20, 2011. The episode follows the Griffin family, and several of their neighbors, as they celebrate the Thanksgiving holiday. As they sit down for dinner, they are shocked to see that Kevin Swanson, son of Joe and Bonnie Swanson, has returned from Iraq.

The episode was written by Patrick Meighan and directed by Jerry Langford. It received mostly mixed reviews from critics for its storyline, and many cultural references. According to Nielsen ratings, it was viewed in 6.04 million homes in its original airing. The episode featured guest performances by Max Burkholder, Jackson Douglas, Kevin Durand, Karen Strassman, Colin Ford, Zachary Gordon, Scott Grimes, Julie Hagerty, Jonathan Morgan Heit, Christine Lakin and Patrick Stewart, along with several recurring guest voice actors for the series.

Plot
As the Thanksgiving holiday begins, Lois invites Glenn and Ida Quagmire, the Swansons, Mayor Adam West, and Carter, Babs and Carol Pewterschmidt to join the Griffin family in a Thanksgiving dinner. Tensions are still high between Ida, Quagmire and Brian since Ida's sex reassignment surgery and her one-night stand with Brian the previous year.

Once the guests arrive, they then begin eating their meal, when suddenly another guest arrives at the door. It is revealed to be Kevin Swanson, the son of Joe and Bonnie Swanson, whom they had presumed had died fighting in the war in Iraq. Overjoyed, they ask why the army had reported that he had died in action. Kevin then tells them a story that he was in a coma following a bomb that had been placed inside a turkey during Thanksgiving years before. Later, while having dessert, Kevin voices his distaste of the war, and reveals several inconsistencies about his time in Iraq. Kevin then tells his father that he had actually gone A.W.O.L., and because most of his unit was killed in the bombing but he miraculously survived, he faked his own death in order to leave the war and return home. Angered by his son's confession, Joe arrests him for the crime of desertion and handcuffs him with the rest of the family criticizing him for lying about being a war hero.

Brian asks Kevin to explain why he deserted the army, with Kevin telling him that he had grown tired of the war, and had befriended many of the Iraqis, leading him to want to try to escape. Kevin and the family then begin fighting over the United States's occupation of Iraq, with Brian sympathizing with him, and several others, including Ida, herself a war veteran, disagreeing with Kevin's choice to desert the army. Joe then begins to take his son to jail. Kevin reminds his father of a time when he let a homeless man get away with stealing a can of tomato soup to feed his hungry family, for whom he had felt sorry. Emotional and sympathetic, Joe agrees to let his son off the hook, and the two make amends.

As the family goes to finish eating dinner, another man resembling Kevin, but with a deeper voice, enters the house and declares the other Kevin to be an imposter, but Peter abruptly ends the episode by nonchalantly declaring "Guys, I don't think we have time for this".

Production and development

The episode was directed by series regular Jerry Langford, shortly after the conclusion of the ninth production season, in his first episode of the season. Langford joined the series in its seventh season, directing the episode "Tales of a Third Grade Nothing". The episode was written by series regular Patrick Meighan, who joined the show as a writer in its fourth season, writing the episode "8 Simple Rules for Buying My Teenage Daughter". Series regulars Peter Shin and James Purdum served as supervising directors, with Andrew Goldberg, Alex Carter, Spencer Porter, Anthony Blasucci, Mike Desilets, and Deepak Sethi serving as staff writers for the episode. Composer Ron Jones, who has worked on the series since its inception, returned to compose the music for "Thanksgiving".

The role of Kevin Swanson has been portrayed by several people, including actor Jon Cryer, in the second season episode "There's Something About Paulie". In subsequent appearances, Kevin was voiced by series creator and executive producer Seth MacFarlane, until his eventual disappearance from the series, when it was revealed that he had supposedly died in Iraq. Actor Scott Grimes, who notably portrays the character Steve Smith in MacFarlane's second animated series American Dad!, took over the role of Kevin in the episode.

In addition to Grimes and the regular cast, actor Max Burkholder, actor Jackson Douglas, actor Kevin Durand, voice actor Colin Ford, actor Zachary Gordon, actress and model Julie Hagerty, actor Jonathan Morgan Heit, actress Christine Lakin and actor Patrick Stewart guest starred in the episode. Recurring guest voice actors Alexandra Breckenridge, actor Chris Cox, writer Mike Desilets, actor Ralph Garman, writer Gary Janetti, writer Danny Smith, writer Alec Sulkin, and writer John Viener also made minor appearances throughout the episode. Recurring guest cast members Adam West, Jennifer Tilly and Patrick Warburton also appeared in the episode as Mayor Adam West, Bonnie Swanson, and Joe Swanson respectively.

Cultural references
As the Griffin family prepare to sit down for their dinner, baby Stewie is shown watching television, with the annual Macy's Thanksgiving Day Parade taking place on the screen. Stewie notices a hot air balloon in the parade resembling himself. After the family decides to go to the Griffin family's backyard to play football, Joe approaches his son to encourage him to beat the other team. Joe then references the 2009 war film The Hurt Locker, with Kevin responding with disdain for the film, despite supposedly being in a coma during its release. Joe also goes on to point out that Kevin is wearing an Ed Hardy t-shirt, which also became popularized during his supposed coma, and despite Kevin telling his father that he flew straight home after he awoke. Later during dinner, when Kevin reveals that he went A.W.O.L., Peter makes an off the wall reference, causing the episode to cut to a room showing several of the show's editors, who become confused about what cutaway to play on the screen. They then decide to play a clip involving several characters from The Wizard of Oz, including the Cowardly Lion, who is shown to be actress Lindsay Lohan's gynecologist.

Reception
"Thanksgiving" was broadcast on November 20, 2011, as a part of an animated television night on Fox, and was preceded by The Simpsons and Allen Gregory, and followed by Family Guy creator and executive producer Seth MacFarlane's second show, American Dad!. It was watched by 6.04 million viewers, according to Nielsen ratings, despite airing simultaneously with the American Music Awards on ABC, The Amazing Race on CBS and Sunday Night Football on NBC. The episode also acquired a 3.1/7 rating in the 18–49 demographic, beating The Simpsons, Allen Gregory, American Dad!, in addition to significantly edging out all three shows in total viewership. The episode's ratings increased slightly from the previous week's episode, "Back to the Pilot".

Reviews of the episode were mostly mixed. Kevin McFarland of The A.V. Club wrote of the episode, "I had a hard time listening to the characters spout out opinions, since none of them really made sense as character views and felt distinctly like the writers just wanted a place to dump their liberalisms – I don't want to only call out Seth MacFarlane because he didn't write this episode, but considering the little bit I know about the show's writer's room, it's pretty safe to assume he has final say on this sort of thing, especially given his 9/11 experience." He also compared the A-story to the television series South Park, noting, "It's very clear that South Park benefits from the short turnaround time between production and air, because it allows that show to comment very quickly on current events, and stay timely. Family Guy seems to do the exact opposite, waiting an extraordinarily long time to weigh in on a serious issue it doesn’t satirize for comedy." He ended his review by commenting, "After last week's bright spot, I knew we were headed back down for another helping of the usual misery, but this week offered neither a surprise nor an all-out failure, just expected, bland mediocrity." He graded the episode as a C. In a much more positive review, Terren R. Moore of Ology, writing, "It's just funny, and it's got a lot of ways of achieving that funniness, and it's definitely true that the show isn't always in its best form, but "Thanksgiving" shows that Family Guy refuses to be dead yet." He also praised the episode for giving each character their own part in the episode, adding, "while most of the story revolves around Joe, Kevin, and Peter, the three kids and Brian also get time in as well." Moore also stated his enjoyment of the cultural references in the episode, stating, "It's all good fun, and the cutaways are also top notch, including Peter's First Holiday and The Cowardly Lion as Lindsay Lohan's gynecologist. I nearly fell out when Peter described his probably-black coworker who turned out to be a white guy, which I should have seen coming because it's very Family Guy, but still managed to get a laugh out of me." He gave the episode a nine out of ten.

References

External links

 

2011 American television episodes
Family Guy (season 10) episodes
Thanksgiving television episodes